The Democratic Unity Party (Partido Unidad Democrática) is a socialist political party in Colombia. 
At the last legislative elections, 10 March 2002, the party won as one of the many small parties parliamentary representation.

Socialist parties in Colombia